The Bailiwick of Guernsey (Guernésiais: Bailliage dé Guernési) is an island country off the coast of France as one of the three Crown Dependencies.

Separated from the Duchy of Normandy by and under the terms of the Treaty (or Peace) of Le Goulet in 1204, the Bailiwick comprises a number of islands in the English Channel which fall into three separate sub-jurisdictions: Guernsey, Alderney and Sark. Herm is administered as a part of Guernsey.

A bailiwick is a territory administered by a bailiff. The bailiff of Guernsey is the civil head and presiding officer of the States of Guernsey, but not of Alderney or Sark. He is the head of the judiciary of the Bailiwick.

History 

The history of the Bailiwick of Guernsey goes back to 933, when the islands came under the control of William Longsword, having been annexed from the Duchy of Brittany by the Duchy of Normandy. The island of Guernsey and the other Channel Islands formed part of the lands of William the Conqueror. In 1204 France conquered mainland Normandy – but not the offshore islands of the bailiwick. The islands represent the last remnants of the medieval Duchy of Normandy.

Initially there was one governor, or co-governors working together, of the islands making up the Channel Islands. The title "governor" has changed over the centuries. "Warden", "keeper" and "captain" have previously been used. The bailiff stands in for the Governor, or more recently the Lieutenant Governor, if the latter is absent, for a short term or for longer, for instance during the five years of the  German occupation of the Channel Islands. The Lieutenant Governor of Guernsey is the Lieutenant Governor of the Bailiwick of Guernsey and, being the personal representative of the British monarch, has usually had a distinguished military service.

Originally the local courts in Guernsey were "fiefs" with the lord of the manor presiding. Before 1066, a superior court was introduced above the fiefs and below the Eschequier Court in Rouen and comprised the bailiff and four knights; the court heard appeals and tried criminal cases.

Otton de Grandson, then the governor of the Islands, delegated the civil powers to two separate bailiffs for Guernsey and Jersey before he went on crusade to the Holy Land in 1290. This can be assessed as the date of first creation of the two bailiwicks.

Geography 

There are many smaller islands, islets, rocks and reefs in the Bailiwick. Combined with a tidal range of 10 m and fast currents of up to 12 knots, this makes sailing in local waters dangerous.

Constitutional status 
The Bailiwick of Guernsey is a separate jurisdiction in itself, and is in turn also three separate sub-jurisdictions. It does not form part of, and is separate from (but is not independent of, or from) the United Kingdom. The two Bailiwicks of Jersey and Guernsey together make up the Channel Islands.

The Islanders have never had formal representation in the House of Commons of the British Parliament, nor in the European Parliament. Those Islanders who were not somehow qualified and eligible in their own right to register to vote and to vote in the United Kingdom under the Representation of the People Acts as overseas voters, were excluded from the 2016 United Kingdom European Union membership referendum.

Guernsey has an unwritten constitution arising from the Treaty of Paris (1259). When Henry III and the King of France came to terms over the Duchy of Normandy, the Norman mainland fell under the suzerainty of the King of France. The Channel Islands however remained loyal to the British crown due to the loyalties of its Seigneurs. However, they were never absorbed into the Kingdom of England by any Act of Union and exist as "peculiars of the Crown".

A unique constitutional position has arisen as successive British monarchs have confirmed the liberties and privileges of the Bailiwick, often referring to the so-called Constitutions of King John, a legendary document supposed to have been granted by King John in the aftermath of 1204. Governments of the Bailiwick have generally tried to avoid testing the limits of the unwritten constitution by avoiding conflict with British governments.

This peculiar political position has often been to the benefit of islanders. Until the 19th century, the Bailiwick was generally able to be exempt from the harsher parts of Westminster legislation, while being included in favourable policies, such as protectionist economic policies. England, and later the United Kingdom, passively exploited the strategic benefits of the Channel Islands. For example, they were able to serve as a convenient stop-off point for trade to Gascony.

Parishes 

The bailiwick comprises twelve parishes: Alderney, Sark and ten on mainland Guernsey (one of which includes Herm). Each parish has a parish church from the 11th century, with strong religious control exercised initially from the French Catholic church and for the last 500 years from the English church. Over the years the religious aspect of the administration of each parish has been reduced in favour of democratically elected douzeniers.

Jurisdictions 
Each jurisdiction has inhabited and uninhabited islands and its own elected government. All three legal jurisdictions need royal assent from the Monarch on its primary legislation. Each jurisdiction raises its own taxation, although in 1949 Alderney transferred its rights to Guernsey.

Alderney

From 1612 Alderney had a judge appointed, with similar judicial powers to a bailiff; but on 1 January 1949 the island adopted a new constitution, giving up some independence, moving closer to Guernsey and confirming that it is part of the Bailiwick of Guernsey.

Guernsey 

The parliament of Guernsey and of the nearby inhabited islands of Herm, Jethou and Lihou is the States of Guernsey.

Sark

Its parliament (together with the inhabited island of Brecqhou) is the Chief Pleas of Sark, with 18 elected members.

In 1565, Helier de Carteret, Seigneur of St. Ouen in Jersey, was granted the fief of Sark by Queen Elizabeth I. He received letters patent granting him Sark in perpetuity, on condition that he kept the island free of pirates and that the island was occupied by at least forty men to defend it. Despite most families coming from Jersey, Sark remained within the Bailiwick of Guernsey.

Recognition

There is no flag or coat of arms for the Bailiwick of Guernsey. In historic times, the governor would have used his personal symbols before a generic flag for use by the governor was created.

In 1279 Edward I granted a Seal for use in the Channel Islands. In 1304 separate seals were provided to Jersey and Guernsey. The provision of separate seals is one of the earliest indications of the separate identity and personality of the two Bailiwicks. The seal comprised three leopards (or lions), a symbol taken from the original arms of the Duchy of Normandy.

The United Kingdom and His Majesty's Government in the United Kingdom are responsible for the defence and also for formal international, intergovernmental and consular representation of, and the foreign affairs generally, of the Bailiwick.

While never a member of the European Union or its predecessors, before Brexit the Bailiwick had a special relationship with the EU, under Protocol 3 of the UK's Treaty of Accession 1972 to the European Community. Pooling resources with Jersey, the Bailiwick established in 2010 an office in Brussels to develop the Channel Islands' influence with the EU, to advise the Channel Islands' governments on European matters, and to promote economic links with the EU.

The Bailiwick of Guernsey is in the Commonwealth (Commonwealth of Nations), although not as a member, in its own right. The Bailiwick is also a member of the Commonwealth Games Federation, and competes in the Commonwealth Games.

In 1969 Royal Mail relinquished control of postal services in the Bailiwick, with Guernsey then being recognised by the Universal Postal Union.

Since 1999 the Bailiwick of Guernsey has been a member of the British–Irish Council, currently represented by the Chief Minister of Guernsey.

References

 
Island countries
Crown Dependencies
Dependent territories in Europe
States and territories established in 1204
Northwestern European countries
English-speaking countries and territories
French-speaking countries and territories